The National Unity is a political movement in Azerbaijan. 
Its candidate Lala Shevket won 3.3% of the popular vote in the 15 October 2003 presidential elections according to the official results of the Central Election Commission.

Political parties in Azerbaijan
Political parties with year of establishment missing